The Governor of Quebec was a British Army officer nominally in charge of the garrison at Quebec City. Often the holder of the post was an absentee, and the office was abolished in 1833.

Governors
 1760–1774: James Murray
 1774–1797: James Johnston
 1797–1800: Staats Long Morris
 1800–1848: William Goodday Strutt

Lieutenant-Governors
 1797–1799: Patrick Bellew
 1799–1811: John Callow
 1811–1813: William Johnson
 1813–1825: Daniel Paterson
 1825–1829: Lachlan Maclean
 1829–1842: William Thomas Dilkes

References

History of Quebec City
Military history of Quebec
British military appointments